The St. Gallen S-Bahn is an S-Bahn-style commuter rail in Eastern Switzerland and neighbouring areas. The network connects stations in the Swiss cantons of Appenzell Ausserrhoden, Appenzell Innerrhoden, Glarus, Grisons, Schaffhausen, St. Gallen, and Thurgau, as well as a few stations in Austria (Bregenz, Vorarlberg) and Germany (Konstanz, Baden-Württemberg and Lindau, Bavaria).

Services are operated by Appenzeller Bahnen (AB), Südostbahn (SOB), and THURBO within the Ostwind transit district.

Lines
, the network consists of 21 lines, numbered 1‒2, 4‒7, 9‒10, 12, 14‒15, 20‒26, 44 and 81‒82, using the "S" prefix typical for most S-Bahn systems. Only lines S1, S2, S4, S5, S20, S21, S22, S81 and S82 pass through or terminate in St. Gallen. The S3 service (‒) belongs to the Vorarlberg S-Bahn network (operated by ÖBB).

Unless stated otherwise, the lines are  adhesion railways.

RegioExpress 
A RegioExpress (RE) between Herisau and Konstanz (Germany), nicknamed der Konstanzer, supports the S-Bahn network. The S-Bahn network is further complemented by InterRegio (IR) services, such as the IR Voralpen-Express (operated by Südostbahn between St. Gallen and ) and IR 13 of Swiss Federal Railways (––St. Gallen––), which stop at all major stations.

Previous services 
 S3: – (until 2021, merged with the former S5 into the current S5 of St. Gallen S-Bahn)
 S8: –– (until 2021, merged with the former S1 into the current S1 of St. Gallen S-Bahn)
 S11: –– (until 2018, operated only during peak hour)
 S55: ––– (until 2018, operated only during peak hour)

See also

Transport in St. Gallen

References

External links

Tarifverbund Ostwind 

S-Bahn in Switzerland
S-Bahn